The 2002 Georgia lieutenant gubernatorial election was held on November 5, 2002, to elect the lieutenant governor of Georgia, concurrently with the 2002 gubernatorial election, as well as elections to the United States Senate and elections to the United States House of Representatives and various state and local elections. Georgia is one of 21 states that elects its lieutenant governor separately from its governor.

Incumbent Democratic lieutenant governor Mark Taylor won re-election to a second term, defeating Republican nominee Steve Stancil.

Democratic primary

Candidates
Mark Taylor, incumbent Lieutenant Governor of Georgia

Results

Republican primary

Candidates

Advanced to runoff
 Steve Stancil, State Representative from Canton
 Mike Beatty, State Senator from Holders

Defeated in primary
 Elbert Bartell, perennial candidate

Results

Runoff Results

General election

Results

See also
2002 United States gubernatorial elections
2002 Georgia gubernatorial election
2002 United States Senate election in Georgia
2002 United States House of Representatives elections in Georgia
State of Georgia
Lieutenant Governors of Georgia

References

2002 Georgia (U.S. state) elections
Lieutenant Governors of Georgia (U.S. state)